Elk Mountain is a summit  in Elko County in the U.S. state of Nevada. The peak is in the northeastern portion of the Humboldt-Toiyabe National Forest about two miles south of the Nevada - Idaho border.

Elk Mountain was named for the elk which once roamed there.

References

Mountains of Elko County, Nevada